The Israeli Personnel Directorate (Agaf Koakh Adam, abbreviated to AKA), formerly called the Manpower Directorate and the Human Resources Directorate, is the Israel Defense Forces body that holds responsibility for planning and coordination of Human Resources placement and movement within the IDF, planning and management of all military Human Resources, and responsibility for the welfare of all servicemembers. The current Head of the Personnel Directorate is Major General Yaniv Asor.

Units and Corps
The Personnel Directorate has eight main corps and General Officer-level units directly subordinate to it, as well as numerous units and sub-units. The six main subordinates are:
Military Police Corps
Education and Youth Corps
Human Resources Corps and Casualties Division
Gender Advisor to the Chief of Defense Staff
Staff Division and General Corps
Human Resources Planning and Management Division
Meitav
Welfare Division
MOFET
Behavioral Science Center

Commanders
Below are the historical commanders of the directorate. All of them finished their duties with the rank of Aluf, although some assumed the position with a lower rank. Includes pre-IDF Haganah commander Moshe Zadok.
Moshe Zadok (May 1947 – 1949)
Shimon Mazah (1949 – December 1952)
Zvi Zur (December 1952 – February 1956)
Gideon Shoken (February 1956 – April 1961)
Aharon Doron (April 1961 – July 1963)
Haim Ben David (July 1963 – July 1966)
Shmuel Eyal (July 1966 – 1970)
Shlomo Lahat (1970–1973)
Herzl Shapir (1973 – April 1974)
Moshe Gidron (April 1974 – 1976)
Raphael Vardi (1976–1978)
Moshe Nativ (1978–1983)
Amos Yaron (1983–1985)
Matan Vilnai (January 1986 – 1989)
Ran Goren (1989–1992)
Yoram Yair (1992–1995)
Gideon Shefer (1995–1998)
Yehuda Segev (1998–2001)
Gil Regev (2001–2004)
Elazar Shtern (2004–2008)
Avi Zamir (2008–2011)
Orna Barbivai (2011–2014)
Hagai Topolanski (2014–2017)
Moti Almoz (2017–2021)
Yaniv Asor (2021–)

External links 
 

Military units and formations of Israel
Israel Defense Forces directorates
Military human resource management